A Flock of Seagulls is the debut studio album by English new wave band A Flock of Seagulls, released in April 1982 by Jive Records. It hit No. 10 on the US Billboard 200 and No. 32 on the UK Albums Chart. The album includes the single "I Ran (So Far Away)", which reached the top 10 in the United States and New Zealand, as well as  1 in Australia. "Space Age Love Song" also reached the US top 40.

Reception

The album received good reviews upon its release and radio airplay. In his retrospective review for AllMusic, Tom Demalon gave the album 4.5 stars, calling it "great fun and a wonderful collection of new wave ear candy."

Critic Robert Christgau was also happy with it, giving it an A− and saying that it is "so transparently, guilelessly expedient that it actually provides the hook-chocked fun most current pop bands only advertise." Other reviews pointed out the bands "pioneering sounds, compelling hooks and undeniably addictive gimmicks."

The band, and particularly this album, were influential during the 1980s for their image and for their production techniques. Record producer Phil Spector called the album "phenomenal."

The album track "D.N.A." won a Grammy Award in 1983 for Best Rock Instrumental Performance.

Track listing

Personnel

A Flock of Seagulls
Mike Score – lead vocals, keyboards, additional rhythm guitar
Paul Reynolds – lead and rhythm guitar, backing vocals
Frank Maudsley – bass guitar, backing vocals
Ali Score – drums, percussion

Production
Mike Howlett – production (all tracks except "Telecommunication", "Tanglimara" and "Intro")
Bill Nelson – production ("Telecommunication")
Steve Lovell and A Flock of Seagulls – production ("Tanglimara" and "Intro")
Mark Dearnley – engineering
Mike Shipley – engineering
"BillBo" – mastering

Charts

Weekly charts

Year-end charts

Certifications

References

Bibliography

 

1982 debut albums
Albums produced by Mike Howlett
Cherry Red Records albums
A Flock of Seagulls albums
Jive Records albums
Science fiction concept albums